Zhao Shangzhi (1908–1942) was a Chinese military commander. Born in Chaoyang, Liaoning, he participated in the May Thirtieth Movement in 1925, and joined the Communist Party of China in the same year. In November 1925, he went to study in the Whampoa Military Academy in Guangzhou.

After September 18, 1932 he took the charge of the CPC Northeast military division. In October 1933, he was in charge of Zhuhe anti-Japan guerrillas, and was promoted to commander of the Northeast Anti-Japan United Army in 1934.

On February 12, 1942, he was captured by Japanese military police after being attacked by an agent provocateur, and died later at the age of 34.

The city of Zhuhe, where he fought against the Japanese, was renamed to Shangzhi in his memory.

1908 births
1942 deaths
Republic of China Army generals
Chinese military personnel killed in World War II
People from Chaoyang, Liaoning
Chinese communists
Generals from Liaoning
People executed by Japanese occupation forces